Johnny Edwards is the name of:

Johnny Edwards (baseball) (born 1938), American MLB National League catcher
John Edwards (born 1953), American politician from North Carolina
Johnny Edwards (footballer) (1912–1973), Australian footballer
Johnny Edwards (musician), American singer and guitarist

See also
John Edwards (disambiguation)
Jack Edwards (disambiguation)
Edwards (surname)